Arranhó is a civil parish in the municipality of Arruda dos Vinhos, Portugal. The population in 2011 was 2,531, in an area of 21.47 km².

References

Freguesias of Arruda dos Vinhos